Cheryl Murray (born Cheryl Frayling-Wright 13 July 1952 in Liverpool, Lancashire) is an English actress, best known for her role as Suzie Birchall on the soap opera Coronation Street, which she played from 1977 to 1979 and again in 1983.

Career 
Murray played the eldest daughter of Billie Whitelaw and sister of Smiths fan Lucette Henderson in the video "Everyday Is Like Sunday" by Morrissey - which was filmed in and around Southend-on-Sea and Westcliff. She also appeared in the fourth series of David Croft's Hi-de-Hi! as Joan Wainwright and as Gillian alongside Ronnie Corbett in the 1980s BBC Television comedy series Sorry!; the episode entitled "Collapse of Small Party".

Murray has been diagnosed with multiple sclerosis and had her first MS attack while working on Coronation Street. Murray retired from acting in 1998 due to her diagnosis years earlier.

In 2014 Murray made a guest appearance on the ITV documentary "Gail and Me: 40 years of Gail on Coronation Street".

Filmography 
 Gail and Me: 40 Years Of Gail On Coronation Street  (2014) Herself
 When Pat Phoenix Met Tony Booth (2002) Herself
 Emmerdale (1998) Mrs. Parker.
 Rich Deceiver (1995) Maria.
 Sorry! (1985) Gillian.
 Hi-de-Hi! (1985) Joan Wainwright.
 Coronation Street (1977-1983) Suzie Birchall.
 Supernatural (1977) Arabella.
 Crown Court (1974–1975) Bella Janes/Mary Wilkins.
 Zigger Zagger (1975) Edna.
 Dixon of Dock Green (1975) Sheila Springer.
 Microbes and Men (1974) Hedwig Freiburg.
 Z Cars (1974) Jean Ramsden.
 Within These Walls (1974) Julie.
 Vienna 1900 (1973) Elise.
 Billy Liar (1973) Pauline.

References

External links

English television actresses
English soap opera actresses
Actresses from Liverpool
1952 births
Living people